Cevizdibi is a village in the central district of Hakkâri Province in Turkey. The village is populated by Kurds of the Ertoşi tribe and had a population of 129 in 2022.

The village was depopulated in the 1990s during the Kurdish–Turkish conflict.

Population 
Population history from 2007 to 2022:

References 

Villages in Hakkâri District
Kurdish settlements in Hakkâri Province